Subashi (also Romanized as Sūbāshī and Soobashī) is a village in Gol Tappeh Rural District, Gol Tappeh District, Kabudarahang County, Hamadan Province, Iran. At the 2006 census, its population was 1,547, in 334 families.

References 

Populated places in Kabudarahang County